Mount Tennant is a conspicuous peak, 690 m, situated at the north end of Rongé Island, off the west coast of Graham Land in Antarctica. It was discovered by the Belgian Antarctic Expedition under Gerlache, who charted Ronge Island in 1898 and named by members of HMS Snipe, following an Antarctic cruise in January 1948, for Vice Admiral Sir William Tennant, then Commander-in-Chief of the America and West Indies Station.

Mountains of Graham Land
Danco Coast